The Usman is a river in the Voronezh and Lipetsk oblasts of Russia. The Usman is home to diverse species of aquatic life.

References

Rivers of Lipetsk Oblast
Rivers of Voronezh Oblast